Jamaluddin Ahmed (born 5 January 1977) is a Bangladeshi cricketer who played in one One Day International in 2003.

A middle-order batsman and off-spin bowler, he played first-class cricket for Khulna Division from 2001 to 2008. When Khulna won the final of the National Cricket League in 2002–03, he scored his first century, 121, and won the man of the match award. He took his best innings and match bowling figures against Barisal Division in 2005-06: 8 for 67 and 3 for 45.

References

External links

1977 births
Living people
Bangladesh One Day International cricketers
Bangladeshi cricketers
Khulna Division cricketers
People from Jessore District